The town hall of Winchester, New Hampshire, is located on Main Street, just south of the junction of New Hampshire Route 10 and New Hampshire Route 119 in the center of the town.

History and building details 
Built of brick in 1911-12 to a design by S. Winthrop St. Clair, it is the only Gothic Revival town hall in Cheshire County.  It was built because the previous town meeting house (a combination town hall and church at the site of the Winchester Memorial Church) was destroyed by fire.  The church was also designed by St. Clair, a Boston-based architect who hailed from Winchester.

The town hall is a roughly rectangular structure, covered by a roof that is gabled at one end and hipped below a very small gable at the other end.  At the northern corner stands an octagonal four-story tower topped by a crenellated parapet.  The interior of the building has two levels: the upper level houses an auditorium space with a stage at one end, with a balcony area that has been converted for use as offices.  The basement level houses additional offices.  The building has seen alterations primarily to its interior, but has retained much of its original design.

The building was listed on the National Register of Historic Places in 1987.

See also
National Register of Historic Places listings in Cheshire County, New Hampshire

References

External links
Town of Winchester

City and town halls on the National Register of Historic Places in New Hampshire
Gothic Revival architecture in New Hampshire
Government buildings completed in 1911
Buildings and structures in Cheshire County, New Hampshire
City and town halls in New Hampshire
National Register of Historic Places in Cheshire County, New Hampshire
Winchester, New Hampshire